The .223 Remington (designated as the 223 Remington by the SAAMI and 223 Rem by the CIP) is a rimless, bottlenecked rifle cartridge. It was developed in 1957 by Remington Arms and Fairchild Industries for the U.S. Continental Army Command of the United States Army as part of a project to create a small-caliber, high-velocity firearm. The .223 Remington is considered one of the most popular common-use cartridges and is currently used by a wide range of semi-automatic and manual-action rifles as well as handguns.

History

The development of the cartridge, which eventually became the .223 Remington, was linked to the development of a new lightweight combat rifle. The cartridge and rifle were developed by Fairchild Industries, Remington Arms, and several engineers working toward a goal developed by U.S. Continental Army Command (CONARC). Development began in 1957. A project to create a small-caliber, high-velocity (SCHV) firearm was created. Eugene Stoner of ArmaLite was also invited to scale down the AR-10 (7.62×51mm NATO) design. Winchester was also invited to participate.

CONARC ordered rifles to test. Stoner and  Sierra Bullet's Frank Snow began work on the .222 Remington cartridge. Using a ballistic calculator, they determined that a 55-grain bullet would have to be fired at 3,300 ft/s to achieve the 500-yard performance necessary.

Robert Hutton (technical editor of Guns and Ammo magazine) started the development of a powder load to reach the 3,300 ft/s goal. He used DuPont IMR4198, IMR3031, and an Olin powder to work up loads. Testing was done with a Remington 722 rifle with a 22" Apex barrel. During a public demonstration, the round successfully penetrated the US steel helmet as required, but testing also showed chamber pressures to be too high.

Stoner contacted both Winchester and Remington about increasing the case capacity. Remington created a larger cartridge called the .222 Special. This cartridge is loaded with DuPont IMR4475 powder.
 
During parallel testing of the T44E4 (future M14) and the ArmaLite AR-15 in 1958, the T44E4 experienced 16 failures per 1,000 rounds fired compared to 6.1 for the ArmaLite AR-15. Because of several different .222 caliber cartridges that were being developed for the SCHV project, the .222 Special was renamed .223 Remington. In May 1959, a report was produced stating that five- to seven-man squads armed with ArmaLite AR-15 rifles have a higher hit probability than 11-man squads armed with the M-14 rifle. At an Independence Day picnic, Air Force General Curtis Le May tested the ArmaLite AR-15 and was very impressed with it. He ordered a number of them to replace  M2 carbines that were in use by the Air Force. In November of that year, testing at Aberdeen Proving Ground showed the ArmaLite AR-15 failure rate had declined to 2.5/1,000, resulting in the ArmaLite AR-15 being approved for more extensive trials.

In 1961, marksmanship testing compared the AR-15 and M-14; 43% of ArmaLite AR-15 shooters achieved Expert, while only 22% of M-14 rifle shooters did. Le May ordered 80,000 rifles. In July 1962, operational testing ended with a recommendation for the adoption of the ArmaLite AR-15 rifle chambered in .223 Remington. In September 1963, the .223 Remington cartridge was officially accepted and named "Cartridge, 5.56 mm ball, M193". The following year, the ArmaLite AR-15 was adopted by the United States Army as the M16 rifle, and it would later become the standard U.S. military rifle. The specification included a Remington-designed bullet and the use of IMR4475 powder, which resulted in a muzzle velocity of 3,250 ft/s and a chamber pressure of 52,000 psi.

In the spring of 1962, Remington submitted the specifications of the .223 Remington to the Sporting Arms and Ammunition Manufacturers' Institute (SAAMI). In December 1963, Remington introduced its first rifle chambered for .223 Remington a Model 760 rifle.

Cartridge dimensions
The .223 Remington has a 28.8-grain H2O (1.87 ml) cartridge case capacity.

.223 Remington maximum CIP cartridge dimensions. All sizes in millimeters (mm).

Americans would define the shoulder angle at alpha/2 = 23 degrees. The common rifling twist rate for this cartridge is 305 mm (1 in 12 in), 6 grooves, Ø lands = , Ø grooves = , land width =  and the primer type is small rifle.

According to the official CIP rulings, the .223 Remington can handle up to  Pmax piezo pressure. In CIP-regulated countries, every rifle cartridge combination has to be proofed at 125% of this maximum CIP pressure to certify for sale to consumers.
This means that .223 Remington chambered arms in CIP-regulated countries are currently (2016) proof tested at  PE piezo pressure. This is equal to the NATO maximum service pressure guideline for the 5.56×45mm NATO cartridge.

Remington submitted .223 Remington specifications to SAAMI in 1964.

.223 Remington vs. 5.56×45mm NATO
In 1980, the .223 Remington was transformed into a new cartridge and designated 5.56×45mm NATO (SS109 or M855).

Dimensions
The external dimensional specifications of .223 Remington and 5.56×45mm NATO brass cases are nearly identical. The cases tend to have similar case capacity when measured (case capacities have been observed to vary by as much as 2.6 grains (0.17 ml)), although the shoulder profile and neck length are not the same and 5.56×45mm NATO cartridge cases tend be slightly thicker to accommodate higher chamber pressures. When hand-loaded, care is taken to look for pressure signs as 5.56×45mm NATO cases may produce higher pressures with the same type of powder and bullet as compared to .223 Remington cases. Sierra provides separate loading sections for .223 Remington and 5.56×45mm NATO and also recommends different loads for bolt-action rifles as compared to semiautomatic rifles.

Rifling
The Sturm, Ruger & Co. AR-556 has rifling at 1:8. Their Mini-14 rifles have rates of 1:9. Ruger's American  bolt-action rifle is also in 1:8.  Smith and Wesson in their M&P15 also uses 1:9.

Pressures
Remington submitted the specifications for the .223 Remington cartridge in 1964 to SAAMI. The original pressure for the .223 Remington was 52,000 psi with DuPont IMR Powder. The current pressure of  resulted from the change from IMR to Olin Ball powder. The official name for .223 Remington in the US Army is cartridge 5.56 x 45mm ball, M193. If a 5.56×45mm NATO cartridge is loaded into a chamber intended to use .223 Remington, the bullet will be in contact with the rifling and the forcing cone is very tight. This generates a much higher pressure than .223 Remington chambers are designed for. NATO chose a 178-mm (1-in-7) rifling twist rate for the 5.56×45mm NATO chambering. The SS109/M855 5.56×45mm NATO ball cartridge requires a 228 mm (1-in-9) twist rate, while adequately stabilizing the longer NATO L110/M856 5.56×45mm NATO tracer projectile requires an even faster 178 mm (1-in-7) twist rate.

Chambers
The .223 Remington and 5.56×45mm NATO barrel chamberings are not the same.  While the cartridges are identical other than powder load, bullet weight, and chamber pressure, a significant difference is in the barrel of the rifle to be used, not in the cartridge. The 5.56×45mm NATO chambers are dimensionally larger in certain critical areas than .223 Remington chambers. As the chambers differ accordingly the head space gauges used for the two chamberings differ.

By observation, 5.56×45mm NATO ammunition is not as accurate as .223 Remington in many of the AR-type rifles extant, even with the same bullet weight. The .223 Wylde chamber specification developed by Bill Wylde solves this problem by using the external dimensions and lead angle as found in the military 5.56×45mm NATO cartridge and the 0.224 inch freebore diameter as found in the civilian SAAMI .223 Remington cartridge. It was designed to increase the accuracy of 5.56×45mm NATO ammunition to that of .223 Remington. Other companies also have chamber designs that increase 5.56×45mm NATO accuracy.

Comparisons

The table contains some estimated pressures based on normal proofing practice and on the known increases in pressure caused by bullet setback (which is a similar occurrence with regard to pressure). The proof pressure of M197 is 70,000 psi.

The following table shows the differences in nomenclature, rifling, throating, and normal, maximum, and safe pressures:

Beside the NATO EPVAT testing pressure testing protocols the other employed peak pressure measurement methodology or methodologies to correlate this table remain unknown.

Effects of barrel length on velocity
Barrel length helps determine a specific cartridge's muzzle velocity. A longer barrel typically yields a greater muzzle velocity, while a shorter barrel  yields a lower one. The first AR-15 rifles used a barrel length of 20". In the case of the 223 Remington (M193), ammunition loses or gains about 25.7 ft/sec for each inch of barrel length, while 5.56×45 mm NATO (M855) loses or gains 30.3 ft/sec per inch of barrel length.

Usage and commercial offerings

The .223 Remington has become one of the most popular cartridges and is currently used in a wide range of semiautomatic and manual-action rifles and even handguns, such as the Colt AR-15, Ruger Mini-14, Remington Model 700, Remington XP-100, etc. The popularity of .223 Remington is so great, that in the US it virtually eliminated all other similar .22 caliber center-fire varmint rifle cartridges.

It is commercially loaded with 0.224-inch (5.7 mm) diameter jacketed bullets, with weights ranging from 35 to 85 grains (2.27 to 5.8 g), with the most common loading by far being 55 gr (3.6 g).  Ninety-grain and 95-grain Sierra Matchking bullets are available for reloaders.

See also
 .30 RAR
 5 mm caliber
 6×45mm
 Delta L problem
 List of rifle cartridges
 Sectional density
 Table of handgun and rifle cartridges

References

100's of 223 Ammo products are listed here. 223 Ammo

External links

 .223 Remington Cartridge Guide by AccurateShooter.com
 A 5.56×45mm Timeline by Daniel Watters
 Ballistics By The Inch .223 Remington results.

223 Remington
Paramilitary cartridges
Remington Arms cartridges
Military equipment introduced in the 1960s